Pendle may refer to:

 Borough of Pendle in Lancashire, England
 Pendle (UK Parliament constituency)
 Pendle Hill in Lancashire, England
 Forest of Pendle, hilly landscape surrounding the hill
 Pendle College of the University of Lancaster
 Pendle Vale College, comprehensive school in Nelson, Lancaster
 Pendle witches, accused in the 1612 witch trial
 Pendle Water, minor river in Lancashire
 Pendle Way, recreational path encircling the borough
 Pendle Grit, geologic formation
 George Pendle, British author and journalist

See also
 Pendle Hill (disambiguation)